Turkey entered the Eurovision Song Contest 1993 with the song "Esmer Yarim" by Burak Aydos, after he won the Turkish national final for the contest.

Before Eurovision

17. Eurovision Şarkı Yarışması Türkiye Finali 
The Turkish broadcaster, Türkiye Radyo ve Televizyon Kurumu (TRT), held a national final to select the Turkish representative for the Eurovision Song Contest 1993, held in Millstreet, Ireland. 

The final took place on 13 March 1993 at the Andromeda discotheque in Istanbul, hosted by Ömer Önder. Eight songs competed and the winner was determined by the audience present in the Andromeda. Only the top 3 songs were announced.

At Eurovision
Aydos performed second on the night of the contest, following Italy and preceding Germany. He received 10 points in total, placing 21st in a field of 25, relegating the country from taking part in the 1994 Contest. The Turkish jury awarded its 12 points to Bosnia and Herzegovina.

Voting

References

External links
Turkish National Final 1993

1993
Countries in the Eurovision Song Contest 1993
Eurovision